La Cour des Grands is a song by Youssou N'Dour and Axelle Red that was chosen as the official anthem of the 1998 FIFA World Cup held in France. 

The song’s title in English was "Do You Mind If I Play."

References

1998 singles
FIFA World Cup official songs and anthems
1998 FIFA World Cup
Youssou N'Dour songs
1998 songs
Sony Music singles
Song articles with missing songwriters